Baner is a suburb in the Western Metropolitan Corridor of Pune, India. Baner is well known for "Varkari" Parampara and Bhakti Aradhana from many years. Baner is bordered by Pashan in south, Balewadi to the west, Aundh to the north and Pune University to the east.

Baner is a residential and commercial hub of Pune and large portions are occupied by various IT companies.

History 

The history of Baner dates back to the 17th century, when the Kalamkar family inherited Baner, becoming the rulers of the area. Kavaji Kalamkar built a temple of the goddess "Tukai Mata" on a hillock near Baner, which is now known as Baner Hill, part of the Baner-Pashan Biodiversity Park.

Administration 
Jyoti Ganesh Kalamkar, Swapnali Pralhad Saykar, Amol Ratan Balwadkar and Baburao Dattoba Chandere were the current corporators of Baner ward (PMC ward Number: 09) in Pune Municipal Corporation.

Geography 
Baner lies in the Western Metropolitan Corridor of Pune. Once in the outskirts, now it is merged into Pune with the help of rapid urbanisation. Baner lies on the foothills of the hills comprising the Baner-Pashan Biodiversity Park. Baner has an average elevation of 570 m ASL. The river, Ramnadi flows through the suburb.

Culture 

Shri Ram, Hanuman, Lakshmi, Tukai, Divyai, Bhairavnath, Sant Savatamali, Baneshwar, Vitthal Rukmini, Ganpati, Dattatray and many temples are part of the cultural heritage of Baner. The most prominent temple in Baner is the Bhairavnath Temple(known as GramDaivat which means Town Deity), located in the middle of the town. During Navratri, there is a large procession to this temple and worshippers gather from around the town to pray there. On every Akshaytritiya people celebrates "Urus(GramDaivat festival)" here which is continuous for 3–4 days. In Urus they organize Tamasha, Kusti and fair. Dattajayanti, Ram Navami, Savatamali Punyatithi, Bhagwanbaba and Navratri are big festivals of Baner. Bhairavnath Devasthan trust organizes the "Ek Gav Ganpati Miravnuk Ek" program every year which gives every Ganpati Mandal in the town to show their talent in front of the whole town. On every Hanuman Jayanti, people celebrate the "Bagada Festival" in the evening.

Agriculture 
Until 2005, Baner was known for its agricultural development. Now, due to the huge number of IT industries and residential complexes, Baner lost this status. Mango, Guava, Tamarind, Jujebes (Indian plums) were the famous fruits of Baner. "Baneri Bore" (Indian plums of Baner) got the brand name because of Baner.

Baner Hill 
Baner Hill is a hill that separates two suburbs of Pune, Pashan and Baner. There is a temple located at the northern foot of the hill. The place is an excellent getaway from the hustle and bustle of the city and provides a great morning trek location for the weekends. One can view the whole of baner on one side and the pashan area on the other. The place is actually the home of a plantation drive that has been taken up enthusiastically by the locals and helped by numerous volunteers. One can see people coming up early in the morning every Sunday and working in groups to make the place greener. Hidden in the route up the Baner Hill is a small cave temple. According to a folklore, these caves date back to the Pandava era and are said to be where the Pandavas lived during their exile almost 5000 years ago. But according to late Ninad Bedekar, the caves belong to the reign of Rashtrakuta Raja, nearly 2500 years ago. The architecture of the caves belongs to the Rashtrakuta dynasty because of the way the pillars as well as the steps into the cave are made. Baner Hill is surrounded by two suburbs of Pune, Pashan and Baner. Most of its area is in Baner, so it is commonly known as Baner Hill. The hillock runs East-West. The temperature here is 1 to 2 degrees cooler than the temperature in the main city. The rest of the area shares almost the same climatic conditions as that of Pune.

Social life and entertainment 
Baner has a large variety of restaurants, cafes and pubs. Some of the most notable ones are Malaka Spice, The K Factory, Minus 18 Degrees, Pimp My Wok and Flying Duck. Baner does not have a full-scale shopping mall or multiplex theatre. Instead one can find individual stores such as Fab India, Westside, Pantaloons etc. It is a popular hang-out spot in the city due to the variety of cuisines on offer and the development of Balewadi High Street.

References 

Neighbourhoods in Pune